The 2019 RFL League 1 was a professional rugby league football competition played in England and Wales and is the third tier of the sport for Rugby Football League (RFL) affiliated clubs. The sponsors for the league are the bookmakers, Betfred and the league will continue to be known as the Betfred League 1.

The league was restructured following a meeting on the RFL clubs in 2018 and League 1 was reduced in size from 14 clubs in 2018 to 12 clubs for 2019.  However on 23 October 2018, Hemel Stags announced that the club was withdrawing from the league for 2019 reducing the number of teams to 11; the RFL indicated that no replacement team is to be sought. The season will consist of 22 rounds with each of the 11 teams playing 20 fixtures against each other home and away and two bye rounds.  The team finishing top will win automatic promotion to the 2020 Championship and be named league champions for 2019.  The teams finishing second to sixth will meet in a series of play-off games culminating in the League 1 Play-Off Final.  The winner of this match will also be promoted to the Championship for 2020.

During the season Coventry Bears were forced to move home fixtures away from Butts Park Arena due to work being undertaken on the pitch by the ground owners, Coventry R.F.C.  Two other clubs also played home games at other venues due to pitch works; Doncaster played three games at Featherstone Rovers LD Nutrition Stadium in July and Workington Town played three games, also in July, at their original ground  Borough Park (now the home of soccer club Workington A.F.C.).

The division was won by Whitehaven who secured the title and the automatic promotion place to the Championship with a 72–0 win over Coventry Bears in the last round of the regular season.  Whitehaven were joined in the Championship for 2020 by Oldham who won the play-offs beating Newcastle Thunder 18–14 in the play-off final.

Teams

*capacity for rugby league games may differ from official stadium capacity.

Results

Standings

Play-offs
The winners of the play-off final will join this season's champions of League 1, Whitehaven, in the Championship in 2020.

References

RFL League 1
2019 in English rugby league
RFL League 1